The A2 motorway is a motorway in Slovenia, around 180 km long, connecting the Karawanks Tunnel (at the Austrian border) via the capital city Ljubljana to Obrežje (at the Croatian border, near Zagreb). It connects several major Slovene cities, including Kranj, Ljubljana, and Novo Mesto, and is part of Pan-European Corridor X.

The route of the motorway largely follows the path of the Brotherhood and Unity Highway, which was a two-lane non-divided road constructed as the main traffic artery within Yugoslavia. With the construction of the divided motorway, most of the previous road was demolished. A notable exception can be seen on the southern A2 segment between Grosuplje and Višnja Gora, where the previous road was grandfathered into the motorway system; it lacks a hard shoulder and has sharp turns and an exit ramp with a 10% grade. The northern segment between Višnja Gora and Grosuplje follows a completely different path, with three traffic lanes and a relatively lower grade.

Junctions, exits and rest area

Tunnels and covered cuts
From the northwest to the southeast, the A2 motorway features the following tunnels and covered cuts:

 Tunnels
 Karawanks Tunnel (with portal)
 Ljubno Tunnel (right: ,) 
 Šentvid Tunnel (right: ,)
 Šentvid Junction (arm B: ,)
 Fat Hill (right: ,)
 Little Peak (right: ,)
 Leščevje Tunnel (right: ,)

 Covered cuts
 Moste 
 Ljubljana–Šentvid
 Šentvid Junction (arm A and arm D)
 Medvedjek (I and II)
 Dolge Dole
 Doline (Karteljevo)
 Dobrove (Otočec)
 Čatež (right and left)

External links 

 A2 Karavanke - Obrežje at DARS, the national motorway operator of Slovenia
 Exit list of A2

Highways in Slovenia